Derek Darko Ohene Assifo Bekoe is a Ghanaian politician and member of the Seventh Parliament of the Fourth Republic of Ghana representing the Upper West Akim Constituency in the Eastern Region on the ticket of the National Democratic Congress.

References

Ghanaian MPs 2017–2021
Living people
National Democratic Congress (Ghana) politicians
1967 births